Ouled Derradj district is an Algerian administrative district in the M'Sila province.  Its capital is town of Ouled Derradj .

Municipalities
The district is further divided into 5 municipalities:
Ouled Derradj
Maadid
M'Tarfa
Ouled Addi Guebala
Souamaa

References 

Districts of Tizi Ouzou Province
Districts of Djelfa Province